Acquaviva is a village in Tuscany, central Italy, administratively a frazione of the comune of Montepulciano, province of Siena. At the time of the 2001 census its population was 1,350.

Acquaviva is about 67 km from Siena and 8 km from Montepulciano.

References 

Frazioni of Montepulciano